Eliane can refer to:

Éliane
 Éliane a French feminine given name
 Éliane, the name for Hill A1 in the 1954 battle of Dien Bien Phu taken by Colonel General Nguyễn Hữu An
 Pierre Éliane (1955), French singer and Carmelite friar

Eliane
In other languages written without the accent:
 Eliane (footballer) (born 1971), Brazilian footballer
 Eliane Elias, a Brazilian singer
 Eliane, a severe European windstorm which struck Scotland on January 8, 2008
 1329 Eliane, a Main-belt Asteroid discovered on March 23, 1933